Simon Willard (1605–1676) was an early Massachusetts fur trader, colonial militia leader, legislator, and judge.

Early life
Willard was born in Horsmonden, Kent, England and baptized on April 7, 1605. He emigrated to Cambridge, Massachusetts in 1634 with his first wife Mary Sharpe and their daughters Mary and Elizabeth. He was a founder of Concord, Massachusetts and served it as clerk from 1635 to 1653 and helped negotiate its purchase from the Native American owners. Willard represented Concord in the Massachusetts General Court from 1636 to 1654, and was assistant and councilor from 1654 to 1676.

Work with settlement and Native Americans
Willard served as an advisor to the Nashaway Company which founded Lancaster, Massachusetts, in the 1640s and 1650s, and he settled in Lancaster by 1660. In 1651 Willard laid out 1,000 acres for settlement along the Assabet River which may have included parts of what is now Maynard, Massachusetts when a Native American leader, Tantamous (Old Jethro), defaulted on a mortgage for a debt due to Concord gunsmith, Herman Garrett, for an unpaid debt. In 1654–55, Willard led an expedition against Ninigret in southern New England, and removed Ninigret's Pequot wards and placed them with Niantic Sachem Harman Garrett in what is now Westerly, Rhode Island. In Massachusetts, Willard served as an advisor to the Nashaway Indians and provided guns to them by order of the Massachusetts General Court. He served as a major of militia in King Philip's War in 1676 at age 70, and he was the Chief Military Officer of Middlesex County, Massachusetts and repelled a Nipmuc force that was besieging Brookfield. He became a magistrate and died aged 71 on April 24, 1676, in Charlestown, Massachusetts while holding court.

The Willard Elementary School in Concord, Massachusetts, is named after Willard. The Liberty ship 0743 Simon Willard was also named after him.

Founding of Old Saybrook, Connecticut 
Simon Willard has been chronicled as one of the founders of Old Saybrook, Connecticut. Willard, then a Sergeant, and Lieutenant Edward Gibbons, were sent by John Winthrop (1606–1676) — son of John Winthrop (1587–1649), Governor of the Massachusetts Bay Colony — to occupy the mouth of what is now the Connecticut River (Long Island Sound) with 20 carpenters and workmen. On November 24, 1635, the group landed on the west bank at the mouth of the Connecticut River. They located the Dutch coat of arms and replaced it with a shield that had a grinning face painted on it. The group established a small fort with a cannon. When the Dutch returned to the mouth of the river, they spotted the English fort and withdrew. The fort was one of the first military establishments in the Connecticut Colony.

See also

Bibliography

Notes

References linked to notes 

   (vols. 51–148);  (vols. 51–148); ; .
  ; .
  ; .
  ; ; .

 

  ; .

  ; .

  ; .

 
  ;  (Vol. 6);  (Vol. 1–6).

General references

  ; .

Further reading

  ; .
  ; .

1605 births
1676 deaths
American militia officers
Colonial American and Indian wars
King Philip's War
Kingdom of England emigrants to Massachusetts Bay Colony
Members of the Massachusetts General Court
People from Groton, Massachusetts
People from Horsmonden
People of colonial Massachusetts